The 2018 Brantford municipal election took place on October 22, 2018. Incumbent Mayor Chris Friel lost re-election to Kevin Davis.

Mayoral candidates 
Chris Friel, incumbent Mayor
Kevin Davis, lawyer and former City Councillor
Dave Wrobel, former City Councillor and mayoral candidate in 2014
Barbara Berardi, local businesswoman
Michael Issa, retired business executive
John Turmel, perennial candidate
Wayne Maw, volunteer and activist

Results

Mayor

Brantford City Council 
Two to be elected from each ward. The map has changed slightly from 2014 due to the annexation of some territory from Brant County.

The results for city council are as follows:

References

Brant 
Municipal elections in Brantford